The 2019 NC State Wolfpack men's soccer team represented North Carolina State University during the 2019 NCAA Division I men's soccer season.  The Wolfpack were led by head coach George Kiefer, in his third season.

Background

The 2018 NC State men's soccer team finished the season with a 10–7–3 overall record and a 2–4–2 ACC record.  The Wolfpack were seeded eight–overall in the 2018 ACC Men's Soccer Tournament, where they beat Boston College in the first round, but lost to Wake Forest in the second round.  The Wolfpack earned an at-large bid into the 2018 NCAA Division I Men's Soccer Tournament, where they beat Campbell in the first round but lost to Maryland in the second round.

Player Movement

Players Leaving

Players Arriving

Squad

Roster

Updated August 19, 2019

Team Management

Source:

Schedule

Source:

|-
!colspan=8 style=""| Exhibition

|-
!colspan=7 style=""| Regular season

|-
!colspan=7 style=""| ACC Tournament

|-
!colspan=7 style=""| NCAA Tournament

Awards and honors

Rankings

References

2019
NC State Wolfpack
NC State Wolfpack
NC State Wolfpack men's soccer
NC State Wolfpack